Phoenicolacerta is a genus of wall lizards of the family Lacertidae. The genus was described in 2007.

Species
Phoenicolacerta cyanisparsa 
Phoenicolacerta kulzeri 
Phoenicolacerta laevis 
Phoenicolacerta troodica 

Nota bene: A binomial authority in parentheses indicates that the species was originally described in a genus other than Phoenicolacerta.

References

 
Lacertidae
Lizard genera
Taxa named by Edwin Nicholas Arnold
Taxa named by Oscar J. Arribas
Taxa named by Salvador Carranza